Kampung Sungai Pusu is a small village in Gombak District, Selangor, Malaysia. This village is located near International Islamic University Malaysia (IIUM) main campus.

Gombak District
Villages in Selangor